Bundoran Junction railway station served Irvinestown in  County Tyrone in Northern Ireland.

The Londonderry and Enniskillen Railway opened the station as Lowtherstown Road on 19 August 1854. It was renamed Irvinestown on 1 March 1863, and Irvinestown Road on 13 June 1866, and finally Bundoran Junction on 13 June 1866 when the Enniskillen and Bundoran Railway opened their line to Bundoran.

It was taken over by the Great Northern Railway (Ireland) in 1883.

It closed on 1 October 1957.

Preserved Signal Cabin

One of the signal cabins from Bundoran Junction (North Cabin) survived long enough to make it into preservation at the Downpatrick and County Down Railway. The wooden top half of the cabin was moved by lorry to Downpatrick in 2011. In October 2015, it was craned onto a flat wagon and hauled through Downpatrick station yard. Upon arrival, it was craned off and placed in its permanent position at the Northern end of the station platform. Work is currently (As of July 2016) underway to restore the cabin to its former glory. It is envisioned that it will become fully functional, replacing the ground frame which controls the station headshunt. Upon assuming this new role, the cabin shall be renamed Downpatrick East.

Routes

References

External links
 http://www.downnews.co.uk/downpatrick-railway-acquires-historic-signal-cabin/
 http://downrail.co.uk/news/2016/01/11/bundoran-jct-progress/
 https://www.flickr.com/photos/mjyrailphotos/albums/72157662887332186

Disused railway stations in County Tyrone
Railway stations opened in 1854
Railway stations closed in 1957
1854 establishments in Ireland
1957 disestablishments in Northern Ireland
Railway stations in Northern Ireland opened in the 19th century